The bare-legged swiftlet (Aerodramus nuditarsus) is a species of swift in the family Apodidae. It is found in New Guinea, in subtropical and tropical moist montane forest.

References

bare-legged swiftlet
Birds of New Guinea
bare-legged swiftlet
Taxonomy articles created by Polbot